The 2018 Codasur South American Rally Championship is an international rally championship sanctioned by the FIA and run by the Confederacion Deportiva Automovilismo Sudamericana (Codasur). The championship was contested over five events held in five different countries across South America, running from March to November.

The championship was won for the sixth time by Paraguayan Skoda driver Gustavo Saba. Saba was second at the opening event in Paraguay before winning rallies in Argentina, Brazil and Bolivia, wrapping up the championship early. In Saba's absence Toyota driver Alejandro Galanti won the final event in Uruguay and was second in the championship. The only driver to beat Saba in 2018, Hyundai driver Diego Domínguez at the opening round in Paraguay, was third overall.

Event calendar and results

The 2018 Codasur South American Rally Championship was as follows:

Championship standings
The 2018 Codasur South American Rally Championship points were as follows:

References

External links

Codasur South American Rally Championship
Codasur South America
Codasur South American Rally Championship